The Panasonic Gobel Awards (formerly Panasonic Awards), are the annual awards presented to television programs and performances in Indonesia based on a people's choice poll. The first award was held in 1997 in partnership with Tabloid Citra and aired on Indosiar. Media Nusantara Citra began conducting the awards in 2000 and its broadcasting rights were held by RCTI. In 2003, TPI and Global TV also began televising the awards.

In 2004, Tabloid Citra stopped polling and instead started using survey data from Nielsen Media Research with the results tabulated and audited by Ernst & Young.

In 2013, MNC Channels also began broadcasting the Panasonic Gobel Awards. In 2017, UseeTV and iNews also began broadcasting the Panasonic Gobel Awards.

The event was handed over to other broadcaster since then. In 2018, TVRI took over the Panasonic Gobel Awards. Following the presence of the 2016 Indonesian Television Awards, MNC decided to end the contract with Panasonic Gobel Awards after 2018. In 2019, Indosiar took back the awards – which was the last edition to be held.

The awards were discontinued after 2019.

History
The Panasonic Awards were first held in 1997 in cooperation with PT. Panasonic Gobel Indonesia with Citra Tabloid (Kompas Gramedia Group, which this tabloid now have not been published). The method of determining the winner is the "Poll image" propagated in the mass media to then filled in writing and sent back by the community through the post. According to Maman Suherman, one of the initiators of this event, Panasonic Awards are intended to determine the people's conscience on impressions and his favorite performers. Overseas event like this so-called People's Choice Awards.

Purpose
The purpose of Panasonic Gobel Awards is to provide an opportunity for viewers to use their views to choose the television shows or people that they consider to be the best. According to this criteria, in which each person is free and independent  through a neutral and transparent polling method, and the process is validated by an independent, credible tabulator.

Date and venue

See also

 List of Asian television awards

References

External links 
 

 
Indonesian television awards
Awards established in 1997
Awards disestablished in 2019